Samak may refer to:
SAMAK, Nordic trade union
Samak, Utah, a census-designated place (CDP) in the United States
Samak, Fars, a village in Fars Province, Iran
Samak, South Khorasan, a village in South Khorasan Province, Iran
Samak Sundaravej (1935-2009), Thai politician
Rosanan Samak, Bruneian football coach and player

See also
Samak-e Ayyar, or Samak the Ayyar, an ancient Persian story